Azatek is a village in the Vayk Municipality of the Vayots Dzor Province of Armenia. Residents of the village came from Salmast in 1828. In the vicinity is a 17th-18th century church and ruins of a fortress locally known as Smbataberd. Two km south is the shrine of St. Hakop from 1072, with a shrine of St. Marinos nearby as well.

Gallery

References

External links 

 
 
 

Populated places in Vayots Dzor Province